Charles Van Acker (14 March 1912 Brussels – 31 May 1998 South Bend, Indiana) was a Belgian-American racecar driver. He first attempted to qualify for the Indianapolis 500 in 1946 but was too slow. In 1947 he made the race and finished in 29th after a crash on lap 24. He also competed in seven more races of the national trail that season and finished 4th in points. In 1948 he finished 11th in the Indy 500 and 10th in the National Championship. 1949 saw him crash 10 laps into the Indy 500 and struggle to qualify much of the rest of the season. He attempted the 1950 Indianapolis 500 but failed to qualify in what would be his last Championship Car appearance.
He owned and operated the South Bend Motor Speedway in South Bend, Indiana and once after a dirt track crash in Dayton, Ohio was declared dead. However, Van Acker claims that the reports were exaggerated and that he was not that seriously injured.

Motorsports career results

Complete AAA Championship Car results

Indianapolis 500 results

Complete Formula One World Championship results
(key) (Races in bold indicate pole position; races in italics indicate fastest lap)

References

American racing drivers
Belgian racing drivers
Indianapolis 500 drivers
1912 births
1998 deaths
Racing drivers from Brussels
AAA Championship Car drivers
Belgian emigrants to the United States